Langhus Station is a bi-hourly railway station at Langhus in Ski, Norway. 

Located on the Østfold Line, at Langhusveien 1405, Langhus is an unsheltered and unstaffed station served by Oslo Commuter Rail, which is operated by Vy.

Langhus Station was opened in 1919.

References

External links
 .

Railway stations in Ski, Norway
Railway stations on the Østfold Line
Railway stations opened in 1919
1919 establishments in Norway